Cristina Marie Crotz (born April 26, 1986) is a former American beauty pageant titleholder from Mesquite, Nevada who was named Miss Nevada 2010.

Biography
Crotz won the title of Miss Nevada on July 3, 2010, when she received her crown from outgoing titleholder Christina Keegan.  She was cast as one of the contestants on ABC's murder mystery reality game show Whodunnit?, and at the end of the season she was revealed to be "the killer."

References

External links
 
 
 

1986 births
Living people
American beauty pageant winners
College of Southern Nevada alumni
Miss America 2011 delegates
Miss Nevada winners
Participants in American reality television series
People from Mesquite, Nevada
People from San Diego